Out of Nowhere is an album by trumpeter Don Ellis recorded in 1961 but not released on the Candid label until 1988.

Reception

The Allmusic site awarded the album 4 stars stating "The players constantly take chances with time but there are few slipups or hesitant moments. A fascinating and long-lost session". The Penguin Guide to Jazz said "Ellis plays lines and melodic inversions of considerable inventiveness, always striking out for the microtonal terrain he was to colonise later in the '60s".

Track listing 
 "Sweet and Lovely" (Gus Arnheim, Jules LeMare, Harry Tobias) - 6:11     
 "My Funny Valentine" (Lorenz Hart, Richard Rodgers) - 4:28     
 "I Love You" [take 2] (Cole Porter) - 4:39     
 "I'll Remember April" (Gene de Paul, Patricia Johnston, Don Raye) - 3:33     
 "Just One of Those Things" [take 8] (Porter) - 3:41     
 "You Stepped out of a Dream" (Nacio Herb Brown, Gus Kahn) - 3:46     
 "All the Things You Are" (Oscar Hammerstein II, Jerome Kern) - 6:10     
 "Out of Nowhere" (Johnny Green, Edward Heyman) - 3:45     
 "Just One of Those Things" [take 5] (Porter) - 3:32 Bonus track on CD reissue     
 "I Love You" [take 1] (Porter) - 5:36 Bonus track on CD reissue

Personnel 
Don Ellis - trumpet
Paul Bley - piano
Steve Swallow - bass

References 

Don Ellis albums
1988 albums
Albums produced by Nat Hentoff
Candid Records albums